No More Wig for Ohio is a studio album by American hip hop producer Odd Nosdam. It was released on Anticon in 2003. It peaked at number 175 on the CMJ Radio 200 chart.

Critical reception

At Metacritic, which assigns a weighted average score out of 100 to reviews from mainstream critics, the album received an average score of 62, based on 6 reviews, indicating "generally favorable reviews".

Stanton Swihart of AllMusic gave the album 2.5 stars out of 5, saying: "The album is potentially valuable as a source for samples, but it fails as a listening experience." Chris Dahlen of Pitchfork gave the album a 6.7 out of 10, saying, "all this disc really tells us is that Odd Nosdam's a solid DJ who likes doofy vinyl." Dave Segal of XLR8R described the album as "hip-hop's answer to The Faust Tapes".

Track listing

Personnel
Credits adapted from liner notes.

 Odd Nosdam – production
 Dax Pierson – keyboards (2)

References

External links
 

2003 albums
Odd Nosdam albums
Anticon albums